Cossila is a neighbourhood of Biella, in Piedmont, northern Italy.

Overview 

It is a borough located some km north-west from the centre of Biella, along the road leading to the sanctuary of Oropa.  From its elongated shape came the Piedmontese saying Cosila, longa e sotila (in English: Cossila, long and thin).

Its southernmost part is called Cossila San Grato and the northernmost one Cossila San Giovanni.

History 
Since 1940 Cossila was a separate comune (municipality), which also encompassed the village of Favaro.

References

Frazioni of Biella
Former municipalities of the Province of Biella